Eric V. Goode (born December 19, 1957) is an American entrepreneur, conservationist, and filmmaker. He is known as the creator of the art nightclub Area, the Bowery Hotel and the Waverly Inn. Goode is also known for being the founder of the Turtle Conservancy and for producing and directing Tiger King.

Biography 
Born in Rhode Island in 1957 and raised in New York City until the age of 8, Eric V. Goode relocated with his family to California. He is the second of five children born to Marilyn Goode, a naturalist and conservationist, and Fredrick Goode, a painter and teacher. He has lived in New York City since 1977.

Eric began his career as an artist, educated at the Academy of Art University in San Francisco, and Parsons School of Design. Much of his early work was displayed in group shows with other upcoming artists of the day, the earliest in 1981 which was curated by Keith Haring. He continued to make and show his art throughout the 1980s and into the early 1990s.

In 1983, Goode formed the nightclub Area. Area was known for its constantly changing themes and collaboration with artists of the time (Andy Warhol, Jean-Michel Basquiat, David Hockney, Keith Haring, Kenny Scharf, and others). Area was Goode's first business venture where he merged art into the context of a nightclub.

In the early to mid-1990s, he directed several music videos for bands such as Nine Inch Nails and Robbie Robertson. He and Serge Becker earned a music video production award for their work on "Pinion".

Over the next two decades Goode transitioned into restaurants and hotels, many of which in collaboration with his partners Serge Becker and more recently Sean MacPherson. His most recent projects include the Bowery Hotel, the Jane Hotel and the Waverly Inn.

Eric Goode currently lives in New York City and California.

Nightclubs, restaurants and hotels 

1981 – The Club with no Name
1983 – Area
1988 – MK
1989 – BC (LA)
1990 – Time Cafe and Fez
1994 – B Bar & Grill
2000 – The Park
2001 – The Maritime Hotel
2003 – Matsuri (closed)
2003 – La Bottega (closed)
2003 – Hiro Ballroom (closed)
2006 – Waverly Inn
2006 – Lafayette House
2007 – Bowery Hotel
2007 – Gemma
2008 – The Jane Hotel
2014 – Ludlow Hotel

Philanthropy and land preservation 
After a career in the hospitality business, Goode shifted his focus to wildlife philanthropy after being approached by John Behler of the Wildlife Conservation Society in 2003. Goode first created a rescue and breeding center for endangered turtles and tortoises under Behler's guidance. In 2005, Goode formed his own public charity the Turtle Conservancy. The mission of the Turtle Conservancy is to protect threatened turtles and tortoises and their habitats worldwide. Goode's conservation philosophy centers around turtles as umbrella species, whereby thousands of species are saved by protecting land for turtles and tortoises.

Since its inception, Turtle Conservancy has helped to protect over 60,000 acres of wild land around the world. The organization works to protect turtles, tortoises and other animals on five continents. Guerilla documentaries and public service announcements directed by Goode and the Turtle Conservancy have amassed millions of views across various social media platforms. These documentaries raise awareness of wildlife trafficking, habitat destruction, and the pet trade. Goode has personally donated over 10 million dollars towards wildlife conservation and land protection. His conservation work has been featured on 60 Minutes, Charlie Rose, Racing Extinction, The New Yorker, NPR and CNN.

Goode was recognized by the wildlife community for his efforts, with a tortoise named after him in 2016. The Goode's Thornscrub Tortoise (Gopherus evgoodei) is a desert species from Northern Mexico described by a team of American and Mexican biologists.

South Africa 
In South Africa, the Turtle Conservancy, along with its partner organizations, has purchased over 900 acres of the last remaining habitat for the critically endangered Geometric Tortoise (Psammobates geometricus).

Sonora, Mexico 
The Turtle Conservancy secured approximately 1,000 acres of Tropical Deciduous Forest in southern Sonora, Mexico, for the protection of the Goode's Thornscrub Tortoise (Gopherus evgoodei).

Durango, Mexico 
The Turtle Conservancy has purchased a significant portion (over 60,000 acres) of the last remaining habitat of the Bolson Tortoise (Gopherus flavomarginatus). The largest of the North American terrestrial reptiles, this tortoise has been known to science only since 1959.

Palawan, Philippines 
1,890 acres was secured for the protection of the critically endangered Palawan Forest Turtle (Siebenrockiella leytensis) in the Philippines.

Other conservation projects 
Other conservation projects that Eric Goode has spearheaded include:

 Goode leads conservation for the Ploughshare Tortoise, the world's rarest tortoise through a partnership with Durrell Wildlife Conservation Trust. Goode has supported conservation both in Madagascar and sits on the Angonoka Working Group Committee.
 Goode supports emerging research for turtles and tortoises by funding the Turtle Conservation Fund, Chelonian Conservation & Biology Journal, and the Turtle Survival Alliance every year since 2005.
 Goode has created a conservation center in Ojai, CA to support local education and wildlife protection.

Boards and councils 

 Board member Turtle Conservancy

 Board member Global Wildlife Conservation

 Board member Rainforest Trust

 Board member Chelonian Research Institute

Publications

The Tortoise 
The Tortoise is an annual magazine publication of the Turtle Conservancy dedicated to the conservation of turtles and tortoises. The wide scope of the magazine reaches readers from all over the world. Its audience includes everyone from world-renowned scientists and biologists, to travelers, naturalists, ecologists and conservationists, as well as a general audience interested in wildlife preservation and environmental protection. It is not a scientific journal. It is a publication about the wonder of turtles and tortoises and about the conservation challenges they face, and it is about the people who are devoted to saving these creatures from extinction.

Area: 1983–1987 
In 2013 Abrams published a 360-page coffee table book on the seminal nightclub AREA, authored by Eric and Jennifer Goode. Drawing from a rich archive of material, Eric and Jennifer tell the behind-the-scenes story of the club and its people, creating an illustrated memoir of an exciting time and place in the history of New York nightlife. To accompany the launch of the book Eric collaborated with Jeffrey Deitch to curate an exhibition at The Hole gallery. The show consisted of original installations as well as pieces from many of the artists that participated or were influenced by the club.

Film and videos

Docuseries 
In 2020, Netflix premiered Tiger King, a seven-episode docuseries directed and produced by Eric Goode about people who own and breed lions, tigers, and other big cats. The show quickly became one of the most watched shows on the Netflix platform.

Natural history films

Music videos

Art 
Most of Goode's art is created as a vitrine, or display case, with three-dimensional artwork inside. Similar to Joseph Cornell, his work incorporates many aspects of assemblage. Goode's work also has notable similarities to Damien Hirst and Jeff Vaughan, especially his tendency to represent elements of the natural world in his mixed-media installations.

Exhibitions 
1981 – Group Show curated by Keith Haring, Mudd Club
1987 – "Subject Object", Group Show, 56 Bleecker Gallery
1988 – Group Show, Bess Butler Gallery
1989 – One Man Show, Bess Cutler Gallery
1989 – "American Pie", Group Show, Bess Cutler Gallery
1989 – "Don't Bungle the Jungle", Group Show, Tony Shafrazi Gallery
1989 – "New Work, New York", Group Show, Helander Gallery
1990 – "Amnesty International", Group Show, Tony Shafrazi Gallery
2013 – "AREA: The Exhibition", Group Show, The Hole Gallery, curated by Jeffrey Deitch and Glenn O'Brien

References 

Living people
1957 births
Nightclub owners
American hoteliers
American restaurateurs
American documentary filmmakers
American conservationists
Artists from Rhode Island
Academy of Art University alumni
American music video directors
Tiger King